The Perak River is the second longest river in Peninsular Malaysia after Pahang River in Pahang, Malaysia. A number of towns are on the banks of the river including the royal town of Kuala Kangsar. Most of the settlements in what is today Perak were situated near the river until the 19th century, when tin deposits were discovered elsewhere, most notably Ipoh. The source of Perak River is in the Perak–Kelantan–Thailand border tripoint near the Royal Belum State Park, in the Titiwangsa Mountains. To be exact, the confluence of Machang River and Merah River, deep in the remoted area of Royal Belum State Park. The Machang River originated from Titiwangsa Range along the Perak – Kelantan border and Merah River from the upper stream of Bang Lang National Park, Thailand. The confluence of these rivers joined together and made up the headwater of Perak River. Some of the branches of the river are the Bidor River and the Kinta River. The Temenggor Dam has created a large man-made lake at Banding near Grik.

History

One of the streams that flows into the Perak River is known locally as the Sungai Kangsar (Kangsar River). The portion that enjoins the main Perak River is known as Kuala. Overlooking the river bank there is a hill where the British Resident for Perak resided and appropriately named as Bukit Residen (Residence Hill). During the British occupation the British Resident being Advisor to the Sultan will conduct the Council Meeting with the Sultan and Chieftains from the districts at Bukit Residen. The council meeting was usually a pompous event with Chieftains coming with sailing boats and the Royalty and palace officials came riding on elephants. The subjects camped at the foot of the Bukit Residen for days as the Council Meeting was usually more than three days. For the subjects the Council meeting was a festival where they congregated at river bank. The subjects and locals had free flows of food and cultural activities at the river bank. Thus the local dialects named the confluence of Kangsar River and Perak River as Kuala Kangsar, Kangsar was coined from the word Council and Kuala means confluence of river.

Literature 
The Perak is mentioned in Rudyard Kipling's story The Crab That Played with the Sea (published as one of the Just So Stories). There, the man complains to his creator, the eldest magician, about the tides running into and out from the Perak: "Once a day and once a night the Sea runs up the Perak river and drives the sweet-water back into the forest, so that my house is made wet; once a day and once a night it runs down the river and draws all the water after it, so that there is nothing left but mud, and my canoe is upset."

Course
The Perak River is the second-longest river in peninsular Malaysia.

The river sources from the highlands in Hulu Perak (Upper Perak) region, near the Thai border. It then flows through the regions two largest towns of Gerik and Lenggong, before meeting with the Kangsar River at the royal seat of Kuala Kangsar. It then enters the Perak Tengah region, flowing through the towns of Parit, Pasir Salak and Kampung Gajah, before emptying into the Straits of Malacca just outside Teluk Intan in the Hulu Perak (Lower Perak) region.

Towns along the river basin
 Gerik
 Lenggong
 Sungai Siput
 Kuala Kangsar
 Manong
 Parit
 Kampung Gajah
 Pasir Salak
 Teluk Intan
 Bagan Datoh

Gallery

See also

 Geography of Malaysia
 List of rivers of Malaysia

References

Rivers of Perak
Rivers of Malaysia